The Shusaku opening, or Shusaku fuseki (秀策流布石), is a famous traditional fuseki for black stones in the game of Go.  It was developed to perfection (but not invented) by Honinbo Shusaku and passed down to the Meiji, Taishō, and Shōwa eras.

With its variants, it constituted the basis of the major theories of fuseki for nearly a century, until the 1930s, at which point the introduction of komidashi and major innovations under the shinfuseki opening occurred. However, as a testimony to its effectiveness, this type of opening is still played by professionals when playing without a komi handicap.

The orthodox Shusaku fuseki is as follows:

Move 7 is famous Shusaku's kosumi, which, Shusaku said, would not be a bad move no matter how Go theories develop.

The opening was displayed in a Google doodle on 6 June 2014 – the 185th anniversary of Honinbo Shusaku's birth.

References

Further reading

External links
 Shusaku fuseki

Fuseki